Barutin Cove (‘Zaliv Barutin’ \'za-liv 'ba-ru-tin\) is the 2.05 km wide cove indenting for 1.03 km the southwest coast of Snow Island in the South Shetland Islands, Antarctica.  It is entered north of Monroe Point and south of Vokil Point.  The cove's shape is enhanced as a result of glacier retreat in the late 20th and early 21st century.

The feature is named after the settlement of Barutin in southern Bulgaria.

Location
Bulgarian mapping in 2009.

Maps
 L.L. Ivanov. Antarctica: Livingston Island and Greenwich, Robert, Snow and Smith Islands. Scale 1:120000 topographic map.  Troyan: Manfred Wörner Foundation, 2009.   (Updated second edition 2010.  )
 Antarctic Digital Database (ADD). Scale 1:250000 topographic map of Antarctica. Scientific Committee on Antarctic Research (SCAR). Since 1993, regularly upgraded and updated.

References
 Barutin Cove. SCAR Composite Antarctic Gazetteer.
 Bulgarian Antarctic Gazetteer. Antarctic Place-names Commission. (details in Bulgarian, basic data in English)

External links
 Barutin Cove. Copernix satellite image

Coves of the South Shetland Islands
Bulgaria and the Antarctic